Pujalt is a municipality in the comarca of the Anoia in Catalonia, Spain.

It comprises the settlements of Pujalt (2013 population: 94), Conill (45), L'Astor (33), La Guàrdia Pilosa (14), and Vilamajor (12).

References

External links
 Government data pages 

Municipalities in Anoia